The Revolutionary Committee of the Batavian Republic was formed on 17 January 1795, when revolution broke out in the Netherlands against the regime of prince William V of Orange. The French army defeated William's army and he fled to Great Britain. Many refugees, who had fled the Netherlands after the Prussian invasion on behalf of prince William V in 1787, could now return. The presidents of the Revolutionary Committee acted as heads of state of the Netherlands (only recognized by France).

Dutch Heads of state in 1795
17 January 1795 - 6 February 1795
Rutger Jan Schimmelpenninck
Wijbo Fijnje
Pieter Paulus

Political history of the Batavian Republic
1795 establishments in the Batavian Republic